Apisit Kamwang is a Thai professional footballer who plays as a  defensive-midfielder for Thai League 2 club Krabi.

External links
 
http://player.7mth.com/250736/index.shtml
https://www.livesoccer888.com/players/Apisit-Kamwang

1991 births
Living people
Apisit Kamwang
Association football midfielders
Apisit Kamwang
Apisit Kamwang
Apisit Kamwang
Apisit Kamwang
Apisit Kamwang
Apisit Kamwang